The Men's 10K race at the 2010 FINA World Open Water Swimming Championships was swum on Sunday, July 18, 2010, in Roberval, Quebec, Canada.

The race began at 11:30 a.m., and was swum in the Lac Saint-Jean in the city centre. 37 men swam the event.

The 10-kilometre distance of the race was reached by completed 4 laps of the 2.5-kilometre course set up for the championships.

Results
All times in hours : minutes : seconds

References

Fina World Open Water Swimming Championships - Mens 10k, 2010
World Open Water Swimming Championships